Phlomis grandiflora, called Jerusalem sage along with a number of other species, is a flowering plant in the family Lamiaceae, native to the eastern Aegean Islands and Turkey. Its cultivar 'Lloyd's Silver' has gained the Royal Horticultural Society's Award of Garden Merit as an ornamental.

References

grandiflora
Flora of the East Aegean Islands
Flora of Turkey
Plants described in 1905